State Route 104 (SR 104) is a north–south highway in Southern Ohio.  Its southern terminus is at U.S. Route 23 (US 23) in Portsmouth, Ohio and its northern terminus is at US 33 in Columbus.  The route passes through or close to the towns of Portsmouth, Waverly, Chillicothe, Grove City, and Columbus. From Waverly to Chillicothe, it overlaps US 23.

Though officially a north-south highway for its entire length, SR 104 is also signed east-west through Columbus.

History
SR 104 is an original state highway with two parts:  One from Portsmouth to Waverly, and one from Chillicothe to Columbus.  The southern part of the route was decertified when U.S. Route 23 was certified in 1926.  This southern route was replaced with the now defunct route number State Route 112.  In 1951, the southern part of the route was recertified as State Route 104, connecting to the northern part of the route by overlapping U.S. Route 23.  The route close to Portsmouth was concurrent with State Route 73.

In March 1951, the Ohio Department of Highways converted an  section of SR 104 south of Columbus into a test strip for traffic signs. It was the first in a series of experiments sponsored by the United Nations in four states and five other countries to compare the effectiveness of national traffic sign standards from around the world. A series of 24 signs from six countries were placed along the road along with distance gauges for 30 test subjects. The department abandoned the experiment four days after it started, after the signs attracted unexpected controversy and curious onlookers who posed a hazard. The experiments eventually led to the Vienna Convention on Road Signs and Signals, which was adopted in many countries but not the United States.

Since 1968, SR 104's northern terminus has been extended twice – to U.S. Route 23 in 1968 and to U.S. Route 33 via freeway in 1989 – and its southern terminus has been extended twice into Portsmouth in 1972 and to U.S. Route 23 in 1974.

In 1998, a section of SR 104, concurrent with SR 73, in Scioto County had its grade raised out of the flood plain to prevent recurring flooding on the roadway in a $3.8 million project.

In 2010, a section of SR 104 north of Chillicothe to SR 207 in Ross County was widened into a four-lane highway. $6.5 million out of the $10.6 million cost to widen were from funds from the American Recovery and Reinvestment Act.

Major junctions

References

External links

104
Transportation in Scioto County, Ohio
Transportation in Pike County, Ohio
Transportation in Ross County, Ohio
Transportation in Pickaway County, Ohio
Transportation in Franklin County, Ohio
History of transportation in the United States